Bala Rostam Hajji (also Romanized as Bālā Rostam Ḩājjī; also known as Bālā Rostam Kolā) is a village in Balatajan Rural District, in the Central District of Qaem Shahr County, Mazandaran Province, Iran. At the 2006 census, its population was 282, in 85 families.

References 

Populated places in Qaem Shahr County